Shaftalu Bagh-e Sofla (also Romanized as Shaftālū Bāgh-e Soflá; also known as Shaftālū Bāgh-e Pā’īn) is a village in Aq Altin Rural District, in the Central District of Aqqala County, Golestan Province, Iran. At the 2006 census, its population was 1,294, in 239 families.

References 

Populated places in Aqqala County